Tūkeri Peak is a peak rising to  at the head of Ringer Valley, Victoria Land. The peak stands midway between Mount Majerus and Spain Peak on the principal ridge of Saint Johns Range. “Tūkeri” is a Māori wind word, meaning force of wind, and was applied descriptively to this peak by the New Zealand Geographic Board in 2005.

References
 

Mountains of Victoria Land
McMurdo Dry Valleys